The 2017–18 season was the 116th season of competitive football in Italy.

Promotions and relegations (pre-season)
Teams promoted to Serie A
 SPAL
 Hellas Verona
 Benevento

Teams relegated from Serie A
 Palermo
 Pescara
 Empoli

Teams promoted to Serie B
 Cremonese
 Venezia
 Foggia
 Parma

Teams relegated from Serie B
 Trapani
 Vicenza
 Pisa
 Latina

National teams

Italy national football team 

On 13 November 2017, Italy failed to qualify for the 2018 FIFA World Cup after a 1–0 aggregate loss to Sweden, the first time they failed to qualify for the World Cup since 1958.

2018 FIFA World Cup qualification

Friendlies

Women

2019 FIFA Women's World Cup qualification (UEFA)

UEFA Group 6

League season

Serie A

Serie B

Serie C

Serie D

Serie A (women)

Cup competitions

Coppa Italia

Final

The final was played on 9 May 2018 at the Stadio Olimpico in Rome.

Supercoppa Italiana

References 

 
Seasons in Italian football
Football
2017 in association football
Football
2018 in association football